Ilyang Logistics Co, Ltd. (hangul:일양택배) is a Korean logistics and shipping company. Headquartered in Seoul, Korea, it was established in 2001. It offers local and worldwide logistics and express mail services. The company is based in Seoul with several branches in Korea and a special branch in Ridgefield, New Jersey, together known as the Ilyang Logistics Group. The "Ilyang Logistics" CEO is Choi Song (최송).

Group companies
DHL Korea (placement by DHL)
Brinks Korea (placement by The Brink's Company)
Ilyang Express
Ilyang Export Packing (formerly Ilwoo Logistics)
Ilwoo Agency

Business products
Domestic Document Exchange Logistic Service
Small-cargo Express Logistic Service
US Visa Logistic Service
Credit Card Logistic Service
Warehouse Service
Bank Exchange Logistic Service
Import Cargo Logistic Service
Airline Express Logistic Service
Shopping Mall Logistic Service

See also
Economy of South Korea
DHL
The Brink's Company

External links
Main
Ilyang Logistics Homepage (in Korean)
Group
DHL Korea Homepage (in Korean)
Brinks Korea Homepage (in Korean)
Ilyang Express Homepage(in Korean)
Logistic Services
Ilwoo Logistics Homepage (in Korean)

Logistics companies of South Korea
Transport companies established in 2001